Anielin  is a village in the administrative district of Gmina Łanięta, within Kutno County, Łódź Voivodeship, in central Poland.

The village has a population of 80.

References

Anielin